Vellarikundu is a town and taluk headquarters in the Hill range of Kasaragod District in the state of Kerala. Vellarikundu is located between Odayanchal and Chittarikkal on Odayanchal-Cherupuzha Road.

Transportation
Vellarikundu is able to connect Mysore and Bangalore by Kanhangad-Panathur-Madikeri Road from Odayanchal. Private and Ksrtc Buses provide routes to Kanhangad, Kasaragod, Mangalore, Mysore, Bangalore, Kannur, Calicut, Kottayam and Pathanamthitta. 

The nearest railway station is Nileshwar Railway Station on Mangalore-Palakkad Line. The nearest airport is Mangalore International Airport on North and Kannur International Airport on South.

History
Vellarikundu Taluk was announced in the Kerala budget of 2013. On 21 February 2014, the new taluk was inaugurated by the Sri Oommen Chandy chief minister of the state. The taluk was created by splitting the Hosdurg taluk.

Tourism
Kammadam Kavu is a sacred grove near Vellarikkundu with 60 acres of rarer birds and other small animals. It is one of the biggest sacred groves of Kerala.

Vellarikundu Taluk
Vellarikundu is one of the four taluks of Kasaragod district. Vellarikundu taluk is carved out from Hosdurg taluk in 2013.

Administration
Vellarikundu taluk has administration over 15 revenue villages. They are: Balal, Bheemanady, Belur, Cheemeni-II, Chittarikkal, Karindalam, Kinanoor, Kodom, Maloth, Palavayal, Parappa, Thayannur, West Eleri, Kallar, Panathady.

References

Nileshwaram area